PCV may refer to:

Biology and medicine
 Packed cell volume, a clinical test
 Palm Creek virus, a virus
 Polycythemia vera, a disease
 Polypoidal choroidal vasculopathy, an eye disease
 Procarbazine/CCNU/vincristine, a chemotherapy regimen for brain tumors
 Pneumococcal conjugate vaccine
 Porcine circovirus, a virus
 Plasma cell variant of Castleman disease
Penicillin V, a type of antibiotic

Transportation
 Passenger Carrying Vehicle
 Propelling Control Vehicle, British railway coach for carrying mail
 Positive crankcase ventilation, of an internal combustion engine

Organisations
 Presbyterian Church of Victoria, Australia
 Presbyterian Church of Vanuatu
 Communist Party of Venezuela (Partido Comunista de Venezuela), a communist party in Venezuela

Other uses
 Product category volume, weighted measure of distribution based on store sales within the product category
 Police Community Volunteer, UK
 Peace Corps Volunteer, of the Peace Corps

See also
PVC (disambiguation)